Aulonemia bogotensis is a species of bamboo. It is part of the genus Aulonemia.
The species is part of the grass family and is endemic to Latin America.
The species is part of the grass family and is endemic to Latin America.

References

bogotensis